Bintang Beer (literally "Star Beer") is a brand of beer from Indonesia and is produced by PT Multi Bintang Indonesia Tbk, part of Heineken.

The beer is styled as a pale lager, gold in colour with an ideal serving temperature of 7 °C. The 4.7% ABV Pilsner has a malt and hop flavour. Because it is a localized version of Heineken, its taste is similar and comparable to Heineken, and the Bintang bottle is reminiscent of a Heineken bottle; the red star on the bottle is the same as Heineken. Bintang makes a malt based beverage called Bintang Zero 0.0%, a low alcohol Radler called Bintang Radler (in both lemon and grapefruit flavours) 2.0%, a soft drink product called Green Sands.

Construction of the brewery began in Surabaya in 1929 during Dutch colonial rule of Indonesia. In 1949, following Indonesian independence, the brewery was renamed 'Heineken's Indonesian Brewery Company'. In 1957 the Indonesian Government appropriated the brewery, and retained control for the next ten years. In 1967 Heineken resumed operations of the brewery, which was later renamed "Multi Bintang Indonesia".

In 2011, Bintang Beer won a gold medal for Lager (Class 2) and Champion Beer for the lager category at the Brewing Industry International Awards (BIIA 2011) in London.

Bir Bintang brand was awarded as Top 50 Most Valuable Indonesian Brand 2013 by Brand Finance.

See also

 Alcohol in Indonesia
 List of Indonesian beverages

References

External links 
 

Indonesian brands
Heineken brands
Beer in Indonesia
Indonesian alcoholic drinks
Beer brands